is a railway station on the Hanshin Electric Railway Main Line in Nada-ku, Kobe, Hyōgo Prefecture, Japan.

Overview

Layout 
This station is elevated and has two island platforms serving two tracks each, and crossovers are located on both sides of the platforms enabling to depart from any track for Osaka and Kobe Sannomiya.

History 
Nishinada Station opened on the Hanshin Main Line on 12 April 1905.

Service was suspended owing to the Great Hanshin earthquake in January 1995. Restoration work on the Hanshin Main Line took 7 months to complete.

Station numbering was introduced on 21 December 2013, with Kasuganomichi being designated as station number HS-28.

Gallery

References

External links

 Station website 

Railway stations in Japan opened in 1905
Railway stations in Hyōgo Prefecture